George Frederick Whitworth (March 15, 1816 – October 6, 1907) was a Presbyterian missionary, educated at Hanover College in Indiana. Whitworth worked as a minister in the Ohio Valley until 1853, when he and his family moved to the Western frontier. 

In 1867, he co-founded the Lake Washington Coal Company. He was active in the founding of the first church in Grand Mound, Washington, which he co-pastored with J. W. Goodell (father of pioneer Phoebe Judson). He was the president of the University of Washington from 1866–67 and 1874–76, and was the founder of Whitworth College (now Whitworth University) in 1890.

Grave 
He is buried at Lake View Cemetery, Seattle, Washington. His grave is an American Presbyterian and Reformed Historic Site (No. 252) registered by the Presbyterian Historical Society, headquartered in Philadelphia.

Notes 
 
 
 
 Guide to the George F. Whitworth Papers 1816-1907

References 

1816 births
1907 deaths
Presbyterian missionaries in the United States
American Presbyterian missionaries
Presidents of the University of Washington
Whitworth University
Hanover College alumni